The Scottish Welfare Football Association (SWFA) is an affiliated association of the Scottish Football Association. It was formed at the end of the First World War to boost morale among factory workers. Historically, over 500 clubs competed in Welfare competitions; however, this has dwindled over the years to fewer than 200 currently. The association oversees competitions mainly operating Sunday and summer or midweek football, predominantly in the North of Scotland.

References

External links
Official website

 
Welfare
Welfare
1918 establishments in Scotland
Sports organizations established in 1918